Houtat Sulūk is a canyon, about  long, in Suluk Subdistrict, Tell Abyad District, Raqqa Governorate, Syria. Locals have reported that some hundreds of, to a thousand dead bodies were thrown to the bottom of the canyon by several militia groups during the Syrian Civil War.

References 

Landforms of Syria